The discography of South African record producer, Tweezy. It includes a list of songs produced, co-produced and remixed by year, artists, album and title.

Singles produced

2014

AKA - Levels
01. "Levels" (produced with Sticky and Master A Flat)
02. "Sim Dope" (produced with Sticky)
03. "Run Jozi (Godly)" (featuring K.O) (produced with Sticky and Master A Flat)
06. "All Eyes On Me" (featuring Burna Boy, Da L.E.S & JR)

2015

Emtee - Avery
10. "Pikipiki"
17. "Five-O"

Fifi Cooper - 20Fifi
08. "Kuze Kuse" (featuring Emtee)

Dreamteam - Dreams Never Die
04. "S'hamba Kanje"
11. "Talk That Shit" (featuring Ice Prince and AKA)
14. "What's Your Name" (featuring NaakMusiQ and Donald)

2016

Chad - The Book of Chad
09. "Chad is Better"
11. "Vibe"

A-Reece - Paradise
01. "Paradise"
08. "Ama Hater"

Stogie T - Stogie T
02. "Big Dreams"
04. "Diamond Walk"
14. "Clean Stuff" (featuring Nasty C) (produced with Co-Kayn Beats)

DJ Sliqe - Injayam, Vol. 1
03. "Mzonkonko" (featuring Blaklez & Ginger Trill) (produced with Psyfo)
04. "Bay 2" (featuring AKA, Yanga & JR) (produced with Psyfo)
05. "Ayay" (featuring Yanga & Maggz) (produced with Psyfo)
06. "iLife" (featuring JR, Okmalumkoolkat & WTF)
07. "Mercy" (featuring Riky Rick, Kwesta, Reason & Thaiwanda)
08. "Flexin'" (featuring Tweezy, Stilo Magolide & Smashis) (produced with Psyfo)
09. "Oceans" (featuring Da L.E.S & Shane Eagle) (produced with Psyfo)
10. "On It" (featuring Shekhinah) (produced with Psyfo)
11. "I Know" (featuring Big Star & Cass) (produced with Psyfo)
12. "Toxic" (featuring BK)
13. "Spaces" (featuring Priddy Ugly & Wichi 1080) (produced with Psyfo & Wichi 1080)

2017

Emtee - Manando
05. "Plug"
13. "Corner Store"

2018

AKA - Touch My Blood
01. "Touch My Blood" (produced with DJ Maphorisa)
02. "Fully In"
05. "Amen" (featuring L-Tido)

References

Production discographies
Hip hop discographies